Alexandru Giugaru (23 June 1897 – 15 March 1986) was a Romanian stage and film actor.

Early life
Born in Huși, Fălciu (present day Vaslui County), Romania, Giugaru began his stage career in 1916 after graduating from school in Cuza Vodă and studying at the Conservatory of Dramatic Arts in Bucharest.

Career
After performing on various stages in Romania — including the National Theatre in Bucharest — he made the transition to film in 1925's Năbădăile Cleopatrei. Between 1925 and his retirement from the film industry in 1968, he appeared in over twenty films. His last film role before retirement was in 1968's Răpirea fecioarelor, directed by Dinu Cocea and starring Toma Caragiu and Marga Barbu.

For his work on stage and film Giugaru obtained the title of Emeritus Artist and the State Prize in 1964. Today, the House of Culture in the city of Huși bears his name and there is a street named after him in Bucharest (Strada Alexandru Giugaru).

Personal life
Alexandru Giugaru had two children; a son and a daughter. He died in Bucharest in 1986. In 2004, his daughter Alexandrina brought accusations against Societatea Română de Televiziune for "piracy" for using images of her father and his voice to promote the television station.

Filmography

References

External links
 
 Port.Ro

1897 births
1986 deaths
People from Huși
Romanian male stage actors
Romanian male film actors
Romanian male silent film actors